Third class may refer to:

 Third class cabin, a class of travel accommodations


Arts and entertainment
 3rd Class, a 2020 Kannada film
 The 3rd Class, a 1988 Egyptian film
 The Third-Class Carriage (Le Wagon de troisième classe), painting by Honoré Daumier

Education
 Third-class degree, a British undergraduate degree classification
 Third class (classe de troisième), a French education level; see National diploma (France)

Other uses
 Class III, a level of creditor; see Preferential creditor
 Third class objects in computing; see First-class citizen

See also